Pierceville can refer to:

Places
United States
Pierceville, Indiana
Pierceville, Kansas
Pierceville Township, Finney County, Kansas
Pierceville, Michigan
Pierceville, Wisconsin